Asong may refer to:

 Asong language, a Southern Loloish language of Yunnan, China
 Clovis Asong (born 1994), British sprinter
 Linus Asong (1947–2012), Cameroonian novelist